The Armenian National Federation of Bodybuilding, also known as the National Bodybuilding and Fitness Federation of Armenia, is the regulating body of bodybuilding in Armenia, governed by the Armenian Olympic Committee. The headquarters of the federation is located in Yerevan.

History
The Armenian National Federation of Bodybuilding was established in 1997 and the current president is Gevorg Hakobyan. The Federation is a full member of the International Federation of BodyBuilding and Fitness. Armenian bodybuilding athletes participate in various European and international level bodybuilding competitions. In May 2015, the Federation organized a joint training seminar with the Russian Bodybuilding Federation. In May 2016, the Federation sent athletes to participate in the Black Sea Cup, winning several medals. 

The Federation also organizes the annual 'Armenian Bodybuilding Championships', where bodybuilders from Armenia and neighboring countries compete.

See also
 List of IFBB member federations
 List of professional bodybuilding competitions
 Professional bodybuilding
 Sport in Armenia

References

External links 
 Armenian National Federation of Bodybuilding on Facebook

Sports governing bodies in Armenia
Bodybuilding organizations
Sports organizations established in 1997